Fatollah Minbashian (1915–2007) was an Iranian football goalkeeper who played for Iran and Docharkheh Savaran.

References

External links
 
 Fatollah Minbashian at teammelli.com

Iranian footballers
Esteghlal F.C. players
1915 births
2007 deaths
Association football goalkeepers
Iran international footballers